, there were around 31,000 electric vehicles registered in Malaysia. , about 0.05% of new cars sold in Malaysia were electric.

Government policy
, electric vehicles are exempt from Malaysian road taxes.

, electric vehicles are exempt from all import duties.

As of 8 February 2023, the Malaysian Ministry of International Trade and Industry (MITI) announced that Tesla has been given approval to establish its presence in the country.

Charging stations 
, there were 251 public charging stations in Malaysia. , there were 9 public DC charging stations in Malaysia.

, the government offers subsidies of up to RM2,500 for charging station installations.

Charging Plug Type Compliance Standard in Malaysia 

 Mode 1: Not Permitted due to its lack of automatic shut-off and not meeting minimum safety requirements.
 Mode 2 and 3: Type 2 connectors only due to their inbuilt locking mechanism and ability to carry both single phase and three phase electrical power.
 Mode 4: CCS Type 2 and CHAdeMO connectors only, specifically designed for DC quick charging and delivering high electrical power.

References

Malaysia
Road transport in Malaysia